Azolla cristata , the Carolina mosquitofern, Carolina azolla or water velvet, is a species of Azolla native to the Americas, in eastern North America from southern Ontario southward, and from the east coast west to Wisconsin and Texas, and in the Caribbean, and in Central and South America from southeastern Mexico (Chiapas) south to northern Argentina and Uruguay.

It is a freshwater aquatic fern, with scale-like fronds 5–10 mm long, green to reddish, most often reddish in strong light and in winter. They are covered in tiny protuberances called trichomes that give it the appearance of velvet. It is able to fix nitrogen from the air by means of symbiotic cyanobacteria.

Identification
The only sure method of distinguishing this species from Azolla filiculoides is to examine the trichomes on the upper surfaces of the leaves. Trichomes are small protuberances that create water resistance. They are unicellular in A. filiculoides but septate (two-celled) in A. cristata.

Name
This species has long been known under the name Azolla caroliniana. However, research by Evrard & Van Hove  found that the type specimen of A. caroliniana actually consists of plants of Azolla filiculoides and so the name caroliniana has always been improperly applied to this species.

Cultivation and uses
Azolla cristata  is of commercial importance in cultivation in southern and eastern Asia as a bio-fertilizer, valued for its nitrogen-fixing ability, which benefits crops such as rice when the fern is grown under it and reduces the need for artificial fertilizer addition. The thick mat of fronds (up to 4 cm thick) also suppresses weed growth. Harvested fronds are also used as a food for fish and poultry. It is also often used as a floating plant in both coldwater and tropical aquaria, as well as in outdoor ponds; it is propagated by division.

References

External links 

The Azolla Foundation
Azolla Philippines A website dedicated to the distribution of Azolla for propagation as alternative livestock feed.

Salviniales
Freshwater plants
Ferns of the Americas
Flora of the Northeastern United States
Flora of South America
Plants described in 1810
Flora of the Southeastern United States
Flora of the North-Central United States
Flora of Texas